Charles Edward Kelly (born November 25, 1963) is an American football coach who is the head coach of the UCLA Bruins. He came to prominence as the head coach of the Oregon Ducks from 2009 to 2012, whom he led to four consecutive BCS bowl game appearances, including the 2011 BCS National Championship Game. This success led to him serving as a head coach in the National Football League (NFL) for four seasons, three with the Philadelphia Eagles (2013–2015) and one with the San Francisco 49ers (2016). Kelly only made the playoffs in his first season with Philadelphia, and he was fired from both teams. After leaving the NFL, Kelly returned to college football in 2018 to coach UCLA.

Early life and education
Kelly was born in Dover, New Hampshire. He attended Manchester Central High School and earned his Bachelor of Science in physical education from the University of New Hampshire in 1990. He played quarterback at Manchester Central and defensive back at the University of New Hampshire. Additionally, he played ice hockey and basketball during his high school years.

Coaching career

Early coaching years
Kelly broke into the coaching ranks in 1990 at Columbia University, where he served as secondary and special teams coach for the freshman team. The next year, he was outside linebackers and strong safeties coach for the varsity team. In 1992, he went to the University of New Hampshire as the running backs coach. He left to become the defensive coordinator at the Johns Hopkins University for one season. He returned to his alma mater as the running backs coach for the next three seasons (1994–96). He was just in time to devise a zone-blocking scheme for star Jerry Azumah. From 1995 through 1998, the speedy back raised the profile of UNH football as he rushed for what was then an FCS record 6,193 yards. He changed to the offensive line coach for two seasons (1997–98).

Kelly was promoted to offensive coordinator at New Hampshire (1999–2006). The Wildcats' offenses averaged better than 400 yards per game of total offense in seven of his eight seasons
In 2004, the school broke 29 offensive school records; compiling 5,446 yards of total offense and scoring 40 or more points in seven games. Their best offensive output was in 2005 when the Wildcats finished second nationally in total offense (493.5 ypg), third in scoring (41.7 ppg) and fifth in passing (300.1 ypg). They completed the season with an 11–2 record.

He was named the College Assistant Coach of the Year by the Gridiron Club of Greater Boston following the 2005 season in addition to being selected as "one of college football's hottest coaches" by American Football Monthly. In 2006, quarterback Ricky Santos won the Walter Payton Award under Kelly's guidance, after Santos finished second in balloting for the award in 2005.

Kelly, along with Florida Gators former head coach Dan Mullen, former Winnipeg Blue Bombers offensive coordinator Gary Crowton, and Ohio State head coach Ryan Day, are part of the so-called "New Hampshire mafia" as they all have strong connections to New Hampshire.

Oregon Ducks (2007–2012)
Kelly coached the Oregon Ducks to BCS games in each of his four seasons as head coach; the 2010 Rose Bowl, 2011 BCS National Championship Game, 2012 Rose Bowl, and 2013 Fiesta Bowl. He coached Oregon to three consecutive outright conference championships from 2009 to 2011 and a conference division title in 2012. Oregon won its second consecutive BCS bowl game after they defeated #5 Kansas State in the 2013 Fiesta Bowl. What may be considered the most important part of Kelly's résumé at Oregon, however, is that he posted undefeated records against the Ducks most hated rivals, the Oregon State Beavers and the Washington Huskies, something never before achieved by an Oregon coach.

He was named the 2009 and 2010 Pac-10 Coach of the Year, 2010 Eddie Robinson Coach of the Year, 2010 Walter Camp Coach of the Year, 2010 Sporting News Coach of the Year, 2010 AFCA Coach of the Year Award, and 2010 Associated Press Coach of the Year.

Offensive coordinator
Kelly was hired as offensive coordinator at Oregon in February 2007. His potent spread offense attack was an instant success at Oregon.

In his first season as offensive coordinator at Oregon, the Ducks led the Pac-10 in scoring (38.15 ppg) and total offense (467.54 ypg), and also became the highest scoring team while amassing the most yards in the history of Oregon football. Prior to Kelly's arrival at Oregon, Dennis Dixon struggled in his first three seasons at quarterback. Under Kelly's guidance, Dixon was the Pac-10 Offensive Player of the Year and emerged as a Heisman Trophy candidate.

In 2008, the Ducks once again led the Pac-10 in scoring (41.9 ppg) and total offense (484.8 ypg), while breaking the school record marks set the previous season.

Head coach
On March 31, 2009, Oregon announced head coach Mike Bellotti would be promoted to athletic director; consequently, Kelly would be promoted to head coach.

2009 season
Kelly helped the Ducks gain national attention in 2009 after an upset of the then #5 USC Trojans on October 31. Kelly became the first Pac-10 coach to win an outright conference championship in his first season, sending the Ducks to the Rose Bowl for the first time since 1995. The Ducks hoped to win their first Rose Bowl since 1917, but lost a close game to Ohio State University. On December 7, 2009, Kelly was named Pac-10 Coach of the year. He was the second Ducks coach to earn the honor, the other being Rich Brooks (two times).

2010 season

Prior to the 2010 season, Kelly suspended Jeremiah Masoli for the season after the quarterback pleaded guilty to second-degree burglary charges, marking the second year in a row that a key player was suspended. Masoli was later dismissed from the team following an arrest for marijuana possession and several driving infractions.

In early October, Kelly led the team to a #1 spot on the AP, Harris, and USA Today Coaches Poll, followed a few weeks later by a #1 BCS ranking. With a 37–20 win over the Oregon State Beavers on December 4, 2010, Kelly led the Ducks to a 9–0 finish in conference play, winning their second consecutive outright Pac-10 title. With Darron Thomas at quarterback and Doak Walker Award winner LaMichael James at running back, the Ducks averaged 49.3 points and 537.5 yards per game in the regular season.

In December, following an undefeated 12–0 season and an end-of-season #2 BCS ranking, Oregon was selected to play the #1 Auburn Tigers in the BCS national championship game on January 10, 2011. The Tigers, out of the Southeastern Conference, were coached by Gene Chizik, and had the Heisman Trophy winner at quarterback in Cam Newton. The Ducks lost, 22–19, on a last-second, 19-yard field goal by Wes Byrum. It was the closest that a team from the Pacific Northwest has come to winning a share of the national championship since 1991.

In recognition of his coaching achievements, Kelly received the Eddie Robinson Coach of the Year award, the Walter Camp Coach of the Year award and was named Pac-10 Coach of the Year for the second year running. Kelly also won the AP Coach of the Year.

2011 season
The 2011 season began with the #3 Ducks facing the #4 LSU Tigers in the Cowboys Classic where they were defeated 40–27. Oregon won their next nine games, including a 53–30 blowout victory at #3 Stanford.

A consecutive trip back to the BCS Championship appeared to be a strong possibility, but they were defeated 38–35 by #18 USC when an Oregon field goal attempt failed as time expired.

The Ducks won their third straight Pac-12 championship title after defeating UCLA in the inaugural Pac-12 Football Championship Game. They represented the Pac-12 in the Rose Bowl and defeated #10 Wisconsin 45–38. It was their second Rose Bowl appearance in three years and their sixth overall. This was Oregon's third consecutive year in a BCS bowl game.

The Ducks finished the season 12–2 (8–1 Pac-12) with a #4 final season ranking.

2012 season
Oregon's all-time leading rusher LaMichael James decided to forgo his senior season in 2012 for the NFL and starting quarterback Darron Thomas, with a career starting record of 23–3, surprisingly also decided to leave early for the NFL.

Led by redshirt freshman Marcus Mariota at quarterback and senior tailback Kenjon Barner, Oregon rolled to ten straight victories before finally falling to #14 Stanford in overtime 17–14 on November 17. Oregon had two opportunities to beat Stanford with a field goal but both attempts failed. Kelly's Ducks would rebound to beat #16 Oregon State in the Civil War for the fifth straight year and play #5 Kansas State in the 2013 Fiesta Bowl. The Ducks proved to be too much for Kansas State as they prevailed to a 35–17 victory in Oregon's fourth consecutive year in a BCS bowl game.

The Ducks finished the season 12–1 (8–1 Pac-12) with a #2 ranking, putting them in the top five of the final season rankings for the third straight season.

NCAA sanctions
On April 16, 2013, The Oregonian reported that the University of Oregon has offered to put its football program on two years' probation in response to NCAA violations that allegedly took place during Kelly's tenure as head coach. On June 26, 2013, the NCAA Committee on Infractions issued its report concluding the investigation into Oregon's use of football scouting services. Oregon received 3 years of probation, reduction of scholarships, but no bowl ban. Kelly received an 18-month show-cause penalty, which would have made an immediate hiring by another NCAA institution difficult. This obstacle became moot, however, after Kelly spent the next four years coaching in the NFL.

NFL interest
New York Giants coach Tom Coughlin tried to hire Kelly as a quality control coach in 2006 when Kelly was still the offensive coordinator at the University of New Hampshire. Kelly turned down the offer and shortly after became the offensive coordinator at the University of Oregon.

In the spring of 2009, Jon Gruden and Kelly spent several days in Tampa, Florida, discussing theories, progressions, and offensive strategies. In November 2010, Kelly visited Pete Carroll at the Seattle Seahawks practice facility during an Oregon bye week.

In January 2012, the Tampa Bay Buccaneers interviewed Kelly for the head coach position but he declined to take the job because he had "unfinished business to complete" with the Ducks.

During the 2012 offseason, Kelly met with New England Patriots head coach Bill Belichick to discuss how he operated the "blur" offense that he ran at Oregon. New England had implemented the hurry up offense as early as 2007. Oregonian columnist John Canzano speculated that Kelly was waiting for the New England Patriots head coaching position to become available.

In early January 2013, numerous NFL teams expressed interest and Kelly was interviewed by the Buffalo Bills, the Cleveland Browns and Philadelphia Eagles. After a seven-hour meeting with the Browns followed by a nine-hour meeting with the Eagles, ESPN's Adam Schefter reported that Kelly initially decided to remain at Oregon. A week later, Kelly accepted the offer from Philadelphia and became the head coach of the Eagles.

Philadelphia Eagles (2013–2015)

Kelly agreed to terms with the Philadelphia Eagles to become the team's head coach on January 16, 2013. Although general manager Howie Roseman ran the team's drafts and free agency signings in his first two seasons with the team, Kelly had the final say over the 53-man roster. His predecessor, Andy Reid, also had the title and/or powers of general manager for most of his tenure.

In his first season, Kelly reversed the Eagles' fortunes of the previous year. Taking over a team that went 4–12 in 2012, Reid's last year, Kelly led the Eagles to a 10–6 record and the NFC Eastern Division Championship, becoming just the second head coach in league history to win a division title in his first season in the NFL. They lost in the first round of the playoffs at home to the New Orleans Saints 26–24, on a last-second field goal.

In his second season in Philadelphia, Kelly finished with an identical 10–6 record, despite key injuries to players like quarterback Nick Foles and linebacker DeMeco Ryans. However, unlike the previous season, the Eagles failed to make the playoffs in 2014.

On January 2, 2015, Eagles owner Jeffrey Lurie announced that Kelly would assume control of the 90-man roster (including authority over the draft and free agency), while Roseman would be "elevated" to the role of Executive Vice President of Football Operations, remaining in control of the salary cap and contracts. Soon afterward, the Eagles traded All-Pro running back LeSean McCoy to the Buffalo Bills for linebacker Kiko Alonso (who was a former Oregon Duck under Kelly) and Pro Bowl quarterback Nick Foles to the St. Louis Rams for quarterback Sam Bradford on March 10, 2015, under Kelly's request. Both trades were met with overwhelmingly negative reception from Eagles fans. He also signed former Cowboys running back and reigning rushing champion DeMarco Murray.

On December 29, 2015, with the Eagles at 6–9, Kelly was fired before the final regular season game, in a statement made by Lurie. It was quickly speculated that he would be a candidate for several NFL head coach openings; on January 7, it was reported that Kelly had met with the San Francisco 49ers about their head coaching position.

San Francisco 49ers (2016)
On January 14, 2016, Kelly was hired by the San Francisco 49ers as head coach. He entered the 2016 season as the 49ers' third coach in three seasons, following Jim Harbaugh and Jim Tomsula. In his first game with the 49ers, they defeated the Los Angeles Rams at Levi's Stadium in a 28–0 romp. It was the first Week 1 shutout since 2009, when the Seattle Seahawks coincidentally shutout the Rams. However, the 49ers went on a 13-game losing streak, with many speculations opening up that Kelly and general manager Trent Baalke may be fired at the end of the season. In late November, there were also many rumors that Kelly would return to coach the Oregon Ducks after the Ducks finished the season with a 4–8 record, the team's first losing season since 2004, resulting in the firing of Ducks football coach Mark Helfrich. Those rumors ceased after the Ducks hired former South Florida Bulls coach Willie Taggart on December 7.

The 49ers finally got their second win of the season on December 24 in a road game against the Rams, then lost their final game of the season on January 1, 2017, at home against the Seahawks. Following the loss to the Seahawks, and having posted a 2–14 record for the season, Kelly was fired by the 49ers, and Baalke was also relieved of his duties after six seasons as the team's general manager.

ESPN (2017) 

On May 26, 2017, Kelly was hired by ESPN as a studio analyst for college football.

UCLA Bruins (2018–present) 
On November 25, 2017, Kelly was hired as the head football coach at UCLA. He had also interviewed for the Florida head coach position. In his first season in 2018, the Bruins began the year 0–5 for the first time since 1943. However, they later defeated USC to snap a three-game losing streak against their crosstown rivals. UCLA finished the season with a 3–9 record, their worst since going 2–7–1 in 1971.

The next season,  the Bruins started 0–3, with losses to Cincinnati, San Diego State, and  No. 5  Oklahoma, all by multiple scores. Under Kelly,  the Bruins  started  0–3 in back-to-back seasons for the first time since 1920–1921. The 0–3 start to the 2019 season gave Kelly the worst 15-game start as a UCLA football coach since Harry Trotter. However, when the Bruins played No. 19 Washington State the following week, they erased a 49–17 deficit and won, 67–63. The 32-point comeback was the third-largest in FBS history.

Two weeks after the win over Washington State, the Bruins lost at home to Oregon State by a score of 48–31. This was only the Beavers' third road win over a Pac-12 opponent since 2014, and their largest road win over a Pac-12 opponent since their 49–17 win at California in 2013. The loss dropped the Bruins to a 1–5 record for the second consecutive year.

After an open date, the Bruins traveled to Stanford and defeated the Cardinal, 34–16. UCLA got its first win over Stanford since 2008, snapping an 11-game losing streak against the Cardinal. The Bruins held the Cardinal to 198 total yards and just 55 rushing yards in the victory.

Following the Stanford victory, the 2019 Bruins defeated Arizona State 42–32 at the Rose Bowl. The Bruins led 42–10 heading into the fourth quarter. The Sun Devils were ranked No. 24 in the AP Poll at the time, and they were favored over the Bruins by three points at kickoff. UCLA then defeated Colorado 31–14 the next week, also at the Rose Bowl. The wins over Stanford, Arizona State, and Colorado gave the Bruins their first three-game winning streak since 2015.

In 2022, UCLA began the season 5–0 for the first time since 2013, and finished 9–4 (6–3 in the Pac-12) with a 37–35 loss to Pittburgh in the Sun Bowl on a last-second field goal by the Panthers. The Bruins were ranked No. 21 in the final polls. After the season, Kelly signed a two-year contract extension that runs through 2027.

Personal life
Kelly is reluctant to discuss his life outside of football. He lives in Los Angeles, California but has a small, tight-knit group of friends in Manchester, New Hampshire, who never speak about him to reporters. ESPN blogger Ted Miller describes Kelly as being "funny, biting, pithy, strange, fiery and surprising when talking to reporters."

Kelly was married to Jennifer Jenkins from 1992 to 1999.

In 2009, Kelly responded to a season ticket holder's letter demanding a refund for his expenses after traveling to see Oregon's 19–8 loss to Boise State.  That loss ended with Ducks running back LeGarrette Blount responding to a Bronco player's taunts by punching him in the face. Kelly replied to the man with a personal check written out for his travel costs (exactly $439); in response, the fan wrote him a thank you note enclosing the original check, which he did not cash, but made copies of to frame.

Awards
2009 Pac-10 Coach of the Year
2010 Pac-10 Coach of the Year
2010 Associated Press Coach of the Year
2010 Eddie Robinson Coach of the Year
2010 Walter Camp Coach of the Year
2010 Sporting News Coach of the Year
2010 AFCA Coach of the Year
2013 Maxwell Club Coach of the Year

Books about Kelly
Books written on Kelly's coaching philosophy and unorthodox strategies:

Saltvelt, Mark (2013) The Tao of Chip Kelly: Lessons from America's Most Innovative Coach. Diversion Publishing. 
Saltvelt, Mark (2015) Controlled Chaos: Chip Kelly's Football Revolution. Diversion Publishing.

Head coaching record

College

NFL

References

External links

 UCLA profile
 Oregon profile

1963 births
Living people
Columbia Lions football coaches
Johns Hopkins Blue Jays football coaches
New Hampshire Wildcats football coaches
New Hampshire Wildcats football players
Oregon Ducks football coaches
Philadelphia Eagles head coaches
San Francisco 49ers head coaches
UCLA Bruins football coaches
NCAA sanctions
Manchester Central High School alumni
People from Dover, New Hampshire
People from Rye, New Hampshire
Sportspeople from Manchester, New Hampshire
Sportspeople from Rockingham County, New Hampshire
Sportspeople from Strafford County, New Hampshire
Coaches of American football from New Hampshire
Players of American football from New Hampshire